Riemerella anatipestifer is a member of the Flavobacteriaceae family. It is a Gram-negative bacterium that causes  septicaemia and death in young ducks and geese throughout the world. There are 21 known serotypes and infection is spread horizontally between birds. Infection may be referred to as Duck Septicaemia, Goose 'flu, Riemerellosis, New Duck Disease and Polyserositis.

Clinical signs and diagnosis
Clinical signs are most commonly seen in birds between the ages of 1–8 weeks old.

Systemic infection is most common, producing a variety of clinical signs. These include diarrhoea, pyrexia, anorexia, stunted growth, respiratory signs (e.g. coughing), neurological abnormalities (e.g. convulsions), and ocular signs. These signs are rapidly followed by death in many birds. Infection may localise in chronic cases.

On post-mortem, a yellow-white exudate and congestion can be seen throughout the body.

The signs seen on clinical exam and postmortem are normally sufficient to make a presumptive diagnosis. This diagnosis can be confirmed using laboratory tests such as bacterial culture, PCR and ELISA.

Treatment and control
Antibiotics are the treatment of choice. The type of antibiotic selected should be determined by licensing and sensitivity testing.

Both a live and inactivated vaccines are available to control the disease. Good husbandry is also an essential part of disease prevention.

References

 Riemerella anatipestifer, reviewed and published by Wikivet at http://en.wikivet.net/Riemerella_anatipestifer, accessed 19/09/2011.

External links
Type strain of Riemerella anatipestifer at BacDive -  the Bacterial Diversity Metadatabase

Poultry diseases
Bacterial diseases
Bacteria described in 1932